Port Louis State Secondary School is a secondary school situated in Port-Louis, Mauritius which was renamed on 11 September 2017 from Port Louis SSS to Abdul Goolam Hamid Mohammed State secondary School. The school was founded in 2003, and was previously known as Colline Monneron SSS.

Initially, when the school was under construction, students attended Rabindranath Tagore Institute Secondary School in the Pamplemousses District.

Educational institutions established in 2003
Secondary schools in Mauritius
2003 establishments in Mauritius
Port Louis